Grenada competed at the 2014 Summer Youth Olympics, in Nanjing, China from 16 August to 28 August 2014.

Medalists

Athletics

Grenada qualified two athletes.

Qualification Legend: Q=Final A (medal); qB=Final B (non-medal); qC=Final C (non-medal); qD=Final D (non-medal); qE=Final E (non-medal)

Boys
Field Events

Girls
Track & road events

Swimming

Grenada qualified two swimmers.

Boys

Girls

References

2014 in Grenadian sport
Nations at the 2014 Summer Youth Olympics
Grenada at the Youth Olympics